Leontophoros was a famous ship built in Heraclea for Lysimachos, one of the largest wooden ships ever built. There exists a fragment by Memnon, the historian of Heraclea, describing the ship:There was one eight (octareme), which was called Leontophoros, remarkable for its size and beauty. In this ship while there were a hundred men rowing each file so that there were eight hundred men from each side, from both sides there were one thousand six hundred oarsmen. Those who fought from the deck were one thousand two hundred. And there were two helmsmen.According to Tarn the ship was built for Demetrius I of Macedon and after his death passed to Lysimachos but this is disputed. This and other information on the ship was analysed by Morrison. Using the data provided by Vitruvius on the space allowed for each oarsman, Morrison concluded that the ship was at least 110 m long and almost 10 m wide. This and other parameters of the ship are subject of controversy. Objections are raised for a ship of such size:

 With the dimensions proposed by Morrison (110 m long, almost 10 m wide), such long vessel would have been difficult to turn.
 A seagoing ship built entirely of wood might be safe in 70–75 m long size, beyond that metal bracings are needed to strengthen the hull.
 The size proposed by Morrison is longer than the longest ships of the line of 19th century: If their hull become too long, the hull cannot withstand differential pressures caused by surface waves.
 It would be surprising if a ship of such size did not suffer from structural problem.

Unlike other known super-ships of Hellenistic age, Tessarakonteres and Syracusia, Leontophoros actually participated in battles (Plutarch, "Demetrius", 20, 43, Memnon, 8.4).

Lysimachos was killed in 281 BC, and his fleet, including Leontophoros was inherited by Ptolemy Keraunos, who then became the king of Macedonia. It is said that the ship was responsible for the defeat of Antigonus II by Ptolemy in 280 BC. According to Memnon:When battle was joined, the victory went to Ptolemy who routed the fleet of Antigonus, with the ships from Heracleia fighting most bravely of all; and of the ships from Heracleia, the prize went to the eight-banker "lion-bearer".Morrison writes:In spite of her success in battle, it was an experiment which, it seems was not repeated, but the beauty of Lysimachos's ship was remembered.

See also 
 Tessarakonteres, a large Egyptian ship with disputed size
 Syracusia, a large ancient Greek ship
 Jong, a type of large Javanese ship, some are noted to be larger than the largest Portuguese ships
 Baochuan, the Chinese treasure ship
 Hellenistic-era warships

References

Ships of the Hellenistic period